The 2023 Copa Paulino Alcantara will be the fifth edition of the Copa Paulino Alcantara, the domestic football cup competition of the Philippines. The 2023 edition marks the second time that the cup includes non-PFL teams, with the first being the inclusion of the Philippines U22 as a guest team in 2019. The Philippine Football Federation intends to invite nine guest teams, aside from the 2022–23 Philippines Football League participants, to raise the total number of teams to 16.

Scheduling
The current date of the competition is unknown. Prior to 2023, the typical schedule would see the Copa being played after the conclusion of that year's Philippines Football League season, with the league shifting to an inter-year format.

Participating clubs
All seven clubs of the ongoing Philippines Football League were expected to participate. Organizers plan to expand the participation of the cup into 16 teams with additional teams invited to enter. Ten other clubs/teams were confirmed to have accepted invitation to participate.

United City withdrew from the PFL in February 2023, leaving its participation in the cup tournament uncertain.

References

Copa Paulino Alcantara seasons
2023 in Philippine football